is a former Japanese football player.

Playing career
Kokubo was born in Gunma Prefecture on September 8, 1980. After dropped out from Tokai University, he joined newly was promoted to J2 League club, Montedio Yamagata in August 1999. He played many matches as midfielder from first season. In 2004, he moved to his local club Thespa Kusatsu in Japan Football League. He played many matches and the club was promoted to J2 from 2005. In 2006, he moved to Prefectural Leagues club Tonan SC Gunma (later Tonan Maebashi). He retired end of 2008 season.

Club statistics

References

External links

1980 births
Living people
Tokai University alumni
Association football people from Gunma Prefecture
Japanese footballers
J2 League players
Japan Football League players
Montedio Yamagata players
Thespakusatsu Gunma players
Association football midfielders